Mark Gregory Koernke (born 1957), known as "Mark from Michigan," is a prominent militia activist and shortwave radio broadcaster.
As an early proponent of the black helicopters conspiracy theory, he was largely responsible for popularizing it in appearances on Tom Valentine's radio show and in speeches which were widely circulated on videocassette. He was host of his own radio show, "The Intelligence Report",  on WWCR until the station indefinitely suspended his broadcasts.  Shortly before his suspension, Koernke had suggested that authorities were setting up Timothy J. McVeigh for assassination.
During this time he was interviewed by Sam Donaldson.

Koernke is also known for his various educational videos on the New World Order. One of his better known pieces of work is called "America in Peril". America in Peril is the first in a trilogy of movies with America in Peril 2, and America in Peril 3 being the following documentaries.

After serving a three-to-seven-year sentence in prison for assaulting police, resisting arrest, and fleeing from police in a car chase, Koernke claimed that he had been set up by John Stadtmiller, co-founder of the Republic radio network syndicating his show.

On March 15, 2007, Koernke completed his sentence and was released from prison. He is not under any parole since he served his entire time sentenced in prison. Koernke initially resumed hosting "The Intelligence Report" on the "Patriot Broadcasting Network" and WTPRN  but now is broadcasting on Liberty Tree Radio  and the Micro Effect. In addition to radio Mark Koernke has many training videos on his YouTube page under the name Libertytreeradio.

See also
American militia movement

References

 - "The fast-growing fringe claims broader influence with its pamphlets, videotapes, shortwave radio programs and computer bulletin board forums. These spread a vision of federal officials duped and controlled by some faceless threat to democracy be it ZOG (an alleged Zionist occupation government), the United Nations or the Russians. Some militant patriot leaders like "Mark from Michigan," Mark Koernke, whose rancorous radio broadcasts briefly made him a suspect in the Oklahoma blast believe the bomb may have been set off by federal agents in order to create a pretext for shutting down the militias."

External links
Radio show archives from WTPRN
Liberty Tree Radio Home Page
Radio show archives from a listener named Spike
Re-broadcast and show archives on Militiaradio.com
Archives of The Intelligence Report
Mark Koernke's YouTube page

Living people
American radio personalities
1957 births